Sphingomonas kaistensis  is a Gram-negative, non-motile and non-spore-forming bacteria from the genus of Sphingomonas which has been isolated from soil in Korea.

References

Further reading

External links
Type strain of Sphingomonas kaistensis at BacDive -  the Bacterial Diversity Metadatabase	

kaistensis
Bacteria described in 2007